Edward H. Ward (1917 – May 1988) was a Welsh rugby union, and professional rugby league footballer who played in the 1930s, 1940s and 1950s, and coached rugby league in the 1950s. He played club level rugby union (RU) for Amman United RFC,  Llanelli RFC, and representative level rugby league (RL) for Great Britain and Wales, and at club level for Wigan (two spells), Oldham and Cardiff RLFC, as a goal-kicking , i.e. number 3 or 4, and coached club level rugby league (RL) for Wigan.

Playing career

International honours
Ted Ward won 13 caps for Wales (RL) in 1946–1951 while at Wigan and Cardiff, and won caps for Great Britain (RL) while at Wigan in 1946 against Australia (2 matches) and New Zealand.

Challenge Cup Final appearances
Ted Ward played right-, i.e. number 3, and scored a goal in Wigan's 8–3 victory over Bradford Northern in the 1947–48 Challenge Cup Final during the 1947–48 season at Wembley Stadium, London on Saturday 1 May 1948, in front of a crowd of 91,465.

County Cup Final appearances
Ted Ward played right-, i.e. number 3, in Wigan's 10–7 victory over Salford in the 1938–39 Lancashire County Cup Final during the 1938–39 season at Station Road, Swinton on Saturday 22 October 1938, played , i.e. number 5, in the 3–7 defeat by Widnes in the 1945–46 Lancashire County Cup Final during the 1945–46 season at Wilderspool Stadium, Warrington on Saturday 27 October 1945, played right-, i.e. number 3, and scored 2-goals in the 10–7 victory over Belle Vue Rangers in the 1947–48 Lancashire County Cup Final during the 1947–48 season at Wilderspool Stadium, Warrington on Saturday 1 November 1947, played right-, i.e. number 3, and scored 1-try, and 4-goals in the 14–8 victory over Warrington in the 1948–49 Lancashire County Cup Final during the 1948–49 season at Station Road, Swinton on Saturday 13 November 1948.

Career records
Ted Ward is one of less than twenty-five Welshmen to have scored more than 1000-points in their rugby league career.

Coaching

References

Note
In some references the Welsh international statistics of Ted Ward are misallocated to Ernest Ward.

External links
!Great Britain Statistics at englandrl.co.uk (statistics currently missing due to not having appeared for both Great Britain, and England)
Statistics at wigan.rlfans.com
Statistics at orl-heritagetrust.org.uk
Statistics at rugbyleagueproject.org (Ted Ward's Great Britain statistics only)
Statistics at rugbyleagueproject.org (Ted Ward's Wales statistics misallocated to Ernest Ward)

1917 births
1988 deaths
Cardiff RLFC players
Footballers who switched code
Great Britain national rugby league team players
Llanelli RFC players
Oldham R.L.F.C. players
Rugby league centres
Rugby league players from Carmarthenshire
Rugby union players from Garnant
Wales national rugby league team captains
Wales national rugby league team players
Welsh rugby league coaches
Welsh rugby league players
Welsh rugby union players
Wigan Warriors coaches
Wigan Warriors players